Mamatheya Bandhana is a 1966 Indian Kannada-language film, directed by B. S. Narayan and jointly produced by B. S. Dwarakish, Veerraju and Madhavaiah under Thunga Pictures. This was actor Dwarkish's first attempt at production as he was one of the three producers of the movie though his first independent production venture was Mayor Muthanna which released three years later. The film stars B. M. Venkatesh, Jayanthi, Dwarakish and K. S. Ashwath in the lead roles. The film has musical score by Chellapilla Satyam.

Cast
B. M. Venkatesh
Jayanthi
Dwarakish
K. S. Ashwath
B. Jayashree

References

1960s Kannada-language films
Films scored by Satyam (composer)